John Jagler (born November 4, 1969) is an American radio broadcaster, communications consultant, and Republican politician. He served in the 37th district of the Wisconsin State Assembly from 2013 until being elected to the Wisconsin Senate 13th district in the 2021 special election to fill the vacancy left by Scott L. Fitzgerald. He was sworn in on April 23.

Early life and career

Born in Louisville, Kentucky, Jagler moved to Oak Creek, Wisconsin, with his family at age 3 and graduated from Oak Creek High School in 1987. After graduating high school, he attended the University of Wisconsin–Parkside, but departed instead to the Trans-American School of Broadcasting in Madison, Wisconsin, where he earned an associate's degree in 1989.

Jagler worked in radio broadcasting for over 20 years, most of it spent at WTMJ radio in Milwaukee. For several years he was the co-host of Wisconsin's Morning News with Gene Mueller. He also started a communications and media consulting firm, Jagler Communications, which he still owns and operates.

Political career

In January 2010, he joined the legislative staff of state representative Jeff Fitzgerald as communications director.  Following the 2010 election, Fitzgerald became Speaker of the Wisconsin State Assembly. Jagler remained on his staff until announcing his own campaign for Wisconsin State Assembly in 2012.

The 37th Assembly district was significantly redrawn in the controversial Republican redistricting act of 2011 (2011 Wisc. Act 43). The previous representative of the 37th district, Democrat Andy Jorgensen, was drawn out of the district entirely, residing in what was—after 2011—the 43rd district, and leaving the 37th district an open seat. The new 37th district was heavily gerrymandered to create a Republican-majority district, and it resulted in a flood of Republican candidates entering the primary for the open seat. Jagler was endorsed by Speaker Fitzgerald and the entire Assembly Republican leadership. He also received substantial support from other Republican officeholders, including, significantly, State Representative Joel Kleefisch, whose 38th Assembly district previously covered much of the territory of the new 37th district. Kleefisch was also, notably, the husband of the new Lieutenant Governor of Wisconsin, Rebecca Kleefisch, with the Kleefisches also being former broadcast reporters. In the August primary, Jagler cruised to victory over his four opponents. He went on to win the 2012 general election with 55% of the vote over Democrat Mary Arnold. Jagler is now serving his fifth term.

Shortly after the 2020 election, where State Senator Scott L. Fitzgerald, brother of former Speaker Jeff Fitzgerald, was elected to the United States House of Representatives, Jagler announced his candidacy for Fitzgerald's state senate seat. Jagler once again faced a crowded primary field and received substantial support from the party; he was immediately endorsed by Scott Fitzgerald. Jagler prevailed in the February primary with 57% of the vote, and went on to defeat Democrat Melissa Winker in the April special election.

Personal life and family
Jagler and his wife, Heidi, have lived in Watertown, Wisconsin, for over 20 years. They have three children.

Electoral history

Wisconsin Assembly (2012–2020)

Wisconsin Senate (2021)

| colspan="6" style="text-align:center;background-color: #e9e9e9;"| Republican Primary, February 16, 2021

| colspan="6" style="text-align:center;background-color: #e9e9e9;"| Special Election, April 6, 2021 (unofficial results)

References

External links
 
 
 Official website
 Representative John Jagler at Wisconsin Legislature
 37th Assembly District map (2011–2021)

|-

1969 births
Living people
Politicians from Louisville, Kentucky
Politicians from Watertown, Wisconsin
University of Wisconsin–Parkside alumni
Radio personalities from Wisconsin
Republican Party members of the Wisconsin State Assembly
Republican Party Wisconsin state senators
21st-century American politicians